Mazimbo may refer to:

 Mazimbo, Tanzania, a place in the Mbeya Region, Tanzania
 Mazimbo (stream), a stream in the Cuando Cubango Province, Angola